Michael Patrick Largey (born August 9, 1960) is an American former professional basketball player. He played the power forward position. He and two of his college basketball teammates were nicknamed the "Bruise Brothers" by their college coach. He played four seasons in the Israeli Basketball Premier League, from 1984 to 1987.

Biography
Largey was born in Red Bank, New Jersey. He was raised in the Port Monmouth section of Middletown Township, New Jersey and attended Red Bank Catholic High School.

He then attended Upsala College. Largey played basketball for the Upsala Vikings from 1978 to 1982. He was named to the 1981-82 National Association of Basketball Coaches Division III All-America Team. He also played for the football team for two seasons, as a place-kicker.

He was drafted in Round 3, with the 58th overall pick, of the 1982 NBA draft by the Washington Bullets. Largey played one season with the Maine Lumberjacks of the Continental Basketball Association.

Largey played four seasons in the Israeli Basketball Premier League. He played in all of them for Hapoel Tel Aviv, from 1984 to 1987, averaging a career-high 25.2 points per game in 1986.

He later became a systems analyst for AT&T.

References

External links
"Mike Largey Wishing Hapoel Tel Aviv Luck," video, April 23, 2012.

1960 births
Living people
Red Bank Catholic High School alumni
American men's basketball players
Basketball players from New Jersey
Hapoel Tel Aviv B.C. players
Israeli Basketball Premier League players
Maine Lumberjacks players
People from Middletown Township, New Jersey
People from Red Bank, New Jersey
Power forwards (basketball)
Upsala Vikings football players
Upsala Vikings men's basketball players
Washington Bullets draft picks